Ceratophyllus sinicus is a species of flea in the family Ceratophyllidae. It was described by Karl Jordan in 1932.

References 

Ceratophyllidae
Insects described in 1932